Paglia is a surname. Notable people with the surname include:

 Nicola Paglia (1197-1256), Italian Roman Catholic priest
 Francesco Paglia (1636–1700), Italian painter
 Antonio Paglia (1680–1747), Italian painter
 Vincenzo Paglia (born 1945), Italian Roman Catholic bishop
 Camille Paglia (born 1947), American social critic, author and teacher
 Ernesto Paglia (born 1959), Brazilian television journalist

See also
 Paglia (river)
 La Paglia, a surname

Italian-language surnames